
Samuel Henry Hooke (January 21, 1874 – January 17, 1968) was an English scholar writing on comparative religion. He is known for his Bible in Basic English translation.

He was born in Cirencester, Gloucestershire. He was educated at St. Mark's school, Windsor and Jesus College, Oxford.

From 1913 to 1926 he was Professor of Oriental Languages at the University of Toronto, where he was a founder of and contributor to Canadian Forum. In 1930 he was appointed Samuel Davidson Professor of Old Testament Studies at the University of London. In 1951, Hooke was president of the Society for Old Testament Study.

Works

Author
Christianity in the Making (1926)
New Year's Day: The Story of the Calendar (1927)
The Origins of Early Semitic Ritual (1938) (Schweich Lectures for 1935)
In the Beginning (1947)
What Is the Bible? (1948)
The Kingdom of God in the Experience of Jesus (1949)
Babylonian and Assyrian Religion (1953)
The Siege Perilous: Essays in Biblical Anthropology and Kindred Subjects (1956)
Alpha and Omega: A Study in the Pattern of Revelation (1961)
Middle Eastern Mythology (1963)
The Resurrection of Christ as History and Experience (1967)

Editor
Myth and Ritual (1933)
The Labyrinth: Further Studies in the Relation between Myth and Ritual in the Ancient World (1935)
Myth, Ritual and Kingship (1958)

Translator
Jesus by Charles Guignebert (1935)
The Parables of Jesus by Joachim Jeremias (1954)
The Prophets and the Rise of Judaism by Adolphe Lods (1955)
Samaria the Capital of the Kingdom of Israel by André Parrot (1958)
Bible in Basic English (BBE) (NT 1941, OT 1949, Revised 1965)

References
Promise and fulfilment; essays presented to Professor S.H. Hooke in celebration of his ninetieth birthday, 21 January 1964 (1963) edited by F. F. Bruce

1874 births
1968 deaths
Alumni of Jesus College, Oxford
People from Cirencester
British biblical scholars
Translators of the Bible into English
Academic staff of the University of Toronto
Presidents of the Folklore Society
Presidents of the Society for Old Testament Study